The men's pole vault at the 2013 World Championships in Athletics was held at the Luzhniki Stadium on 10–12 August.

Records
Prior to the competition, the records were as follows:

Qualification standards

Schedule

Results

Qualification
Qualification: 5.70 m (Q) and at least 12 best (q) advanced to the final.

Final
The final was started at 19:00.

References

External links
Pole vault results at IAAF website

Pole vault
Pole vault at the World Athletics Championships